Joe Chandler (born 2 November 1988) is an English professional rugby league footballer who has played in the 2000s and 2010s.

Background
Joe Chandler was born in Dewsbury, West Yorkshire, England.

Playing career
He has previously played for Churwell Chiefs ARLFC and the Leeds Rhinos, making one Super League appearance for the club in 2008 in an 18–12 victory over the Castleford Tigers.

References

External links
 (archived by web.archive.org) Leeds Rhinos profile

1988 births
Living people
Batley Bulldogs players
Dewsbury Rams players
English rugby league players
Halifax R.L.F.C. players
Hunslet R.L.F.C. players
Keighley Cougars players
Leeds Rhinos players
Oldham R.L.F.C. players
Rugby league players from Dewsbury
Rugby league props